Alf Collett (8 August 1844 – 12  June 1919) was a Norwegian writer and historian.

Biography
Alf Collett was born at Eidsvoll in Akershus, Norway. He was the second son of professor Peter Jonas Collett (1813-1851)  and Camilla Collett (1813-1895). His maternal uncles included Oscar and Henrik Wergeland, and his paternal uncles included Peter Severin Steenstrup. He had one older brother Robert, a notable zoologist, and two younger brothers. He married Mathilda Sophie Kallevig (1845-1915), but they did not have any children.

He attended Oslo Cathedral School. 
He became cand.jur. in 1865. From 1867 he was employed  in the Ministry of Marine and Post Affairs and became bureau chief in 1880. In 1885, he was transferred to the Ministry of Defense and from 1899 to 1919 he was director general of the Naval Administration. He was made a  knight 1st Grade of the Order of  Saint Olav. He died during 1919 at Kristiania and was buried at Vår Frelsers gravlund  

He published many historical and genealogical works, the most important being En gammel Christiania-slægt (1883) and Gamle Christiania-Billeder (1893).

Selected works
Familien Collett, 1872
Familien Elieson, 1881
Fladeby, 1881
Raadmand Peder Pedersen Müllers Efterkommere, 1881
Gamle Christiania-Billeder, 1893 
Camilla Colletts livs historie belyst ved hendes breve og dagbøker, 1911
En gammel Christiania-Slægt, 1883

References

External links 
 The family tree of Alf Collett on Geni.com

1844 births
1919 deaths
People from Eidsvoll
People educated at Oslo Cathedral School
Norwegian jurists
19th-century Norwegian historians
Norwegian genealogists 
Norwegian non-fiction writers
Alf
Norwegian people of English descent
Order of  Saint Olav
Burials at the Cemetery of Our Saviour